Teele Square is at the intersection of Broadway, Holland Street, and Curtis Street in Somerville, Massachusetts, a half-mile from Davis Square and the Davis Square stop on the MBTA Red Line, as well as a half-mile from Alewife Brook Parkway (Route 16) and Powder House Square.  The square sits on Clarendon Hill, one of the seven hills of Somerville. The square is named after Jonathan W. Teele, who resided in an early portion of Charlestown that eventually became Somerville in 1842.

The square is within a short walking distance of Tufts University. It is not far from the town lines of Cambridge, Arlington, and Medford.

The square features a wide variety of eateries including Rudy's (Tex-Mex), PJ Ryan's Irish Pub, Broadway Eatery (Pizza & Burgers), Angelina's Pizzeria, House of Tibet Kitchen, Masala (Indian), Istanbul'lu (Turkish), True Bistro (Vegan), Magnificent Muffin & Bagel (breakfast only), and Renee's Cafe.  There are three convenience stores in Teele Square, a barber, three hair salons and a liquor store. However, Teele Square has been trumped by Davis Square, a larger, much more popular square  to the east from Teele Square.

On October 30, 2011 at approximately 10:00pm, A three-alarm fire broke out in a dry cleaners and destroyed four businesses and a police sub-station in Teele Square.

Teele Square is also home to Ladder 3 and Engine 6 of the Somerville Fire Department.

Within Teele Square and the areas in Teele Square, there is also a large Haitian American population and a large white American population. It is considered one of Somerville's more diverse neighborhoods along with Winter Hill, East Somerville and Union Square. Also, Teele Square is a lower income neighborhood compared to the neighborhoods surrounding the neighborhood.

References

External links
 Official website

Neighborhoods in Somerville, Massachusetts